One Records is a Scottish record label.

Current artists 
 El Presidente a Scottish glam-rock band fronted by Dante Gizzi. 
 We Are The Physics a Scottish indie band. 
 Xcerts a Scottish pop/rock band.

Past artists 
 Matchsticks a pop/electro band from Glasgow. 
 Fickle Public a Glasgow indie band. 
 Drive-by Argument
 Ludovico

See also
 List of record labels

External links 
 One Records | Listen and Stream Free Music, Albums, New Releases, Photos, Videos
 ELPresidenteMusic – *ELPresidenteMusic* *MusicProduction Cologne*
 THE XCERTS | Listen and Stream Free Music, Albums, New Releases, Photos, Videos
 Matchsticks R.I.P. | Listen and Stream Free Music, Albums, New Releases, Photos, Videos
 driveĎy argument

Scottish record labels
Indie rock record labels
Alternative rock record labels